Cold Blow and the Rainy Night is the third album by the Irish folk group Planxty. It was recorded in Sarm Studios, Whitechapel, London during August 1974 and released the same year. It takes its title from the third song on the album, "Cold Blow and the Rainy Night".

Track listing
All titles are Traditional, arranged by Planxty, except where indicated.

"Johnny Cope" (song & hornpipe) – 5:16 
"Dennis Murphy's Polka"/"The 42-Pound Cheque"/"John Ryan's Polka" (polkas) – 3:07
"Cold Blow And The Rainy Night" (song) – 2:40
"'P' Stands For Paddy, I Suppose" (song) – 4:36
"The Old Torn Petticoat"/"The Dublin Reel"/"The Wind That Shakes The Barley" (reels) – 3:46
"Băneasă's Green Glade"/"Mominsko Horo" (song/Balkan dance) – 5:48(Andy Irvine)/(Trad., Arr. Irvine-Lunny)
"The Little Drummer" (song) – 3:16
"The Lakes Of Pontchartrain" (song) – 5:48
"The Hare In The Corn"/"The Frost Is All Over"/"The Gander In The Pratie Hole" (jigs) – 4:22
"The Green Fields Of Canada" (song) – 6:55

Personnel
Christy Moore - vocals, guitar, bodhrán, harmonium
Andy Irvine - vocals, mandolin, bouzouki, harmonica, hurdy-gurdy, dulcimer
Dónal Lunny - guitar, bouzouki, portative organ, bodhrán
Johnny Moynihan - vocals, bouzouki, fiddle, tin whistle
Liam O'Flynn - uilleann pipes, tin whistle

References

1974 albums
Planxty albums
Albums produced by Phil Coulter
Polydor Records albums